Elena Celledoni (born 1967) is an Italian mathematician who works in Norway as a professor of mathematical sciences at the Norwegian University of Science and Technology (NTNU). Her research involves the numerical analysis of numerical algorithms for partial differential equations and for Lie group computations, including the study of structure preserving algorithms.

Education and career
Celledoni earned a master's degree at the University of Trieste in 1993. She completed a Ph.D. at the University of Padua in 1997. Her dissertation, Krylov Subspace Methods For Linear Systems Of ODEs, was jointly supervised by Igor Moret and Alfredo Bellen.

Before becoming a faculty member at NTNU in 2004, she was a postdoctoral researcher at the University of Cambridge, at the Mathematical Sciences Research Institute, and at NTNU.

Recognition
Celledoni is a member of the Royal Norwegian Society of Sciences and Letters.

References

External links

1967 births
Living people
Italian mathematicians
Italian women mathematicians
Norwegian mathematicians
Norwegian women mathematicians
University of Trieste alumni
University of Padua alumni
Academic staff of the Norwegian University of Science and Technology
Royal Norwegian Society of Sciences and Letters